The fourth season of the American ABC fantasy-drama series Once Upon a Time was announced on May 8, 2014. On May 13, 2014, it was revealed that like the previous season, this season would also be split into two parts, the first half airing during autumn 2014, and the second half during spring 2015 of the 2014–15 television season. It premiered on September 28, 2014, and concluded on May 10, 2015. Michael Socha joined the main cast for the season as Will Scarlet / Knave of Hearts, reprising his role from Once Upon a Time in Wonderland.

Existing fictional characters introduced to the series during the season include the main antagonists for the two volumes, the Snow Queen and the Queens of Darkness (a triad of villains including returning character Maleficent, and new characters Cruella de Vil and Ursula), alongside Elsa, Anna, Kristoff, the Apprentice, Little Bo Peep and Poseidon.

Premise
Elsa is brought by accident from the Enchanted Forest of the past to present day Storybrooke in search of her sister Anna. With help from Emma, Elsa discovers her past with the mysterious Snow Queen. Emma learns that the Snow Queen was her former foster parent who has plans to replace her long deceased sisters with Emma and Elsa, using the Spell of Shattered Sight to ensure no one can foil her plans. This ultimately leads to the Snow Queen's undoing and consequently Mr. Gold's banishment from Storybrooke. The Queens of Darkness, which consists of Maleficent, Ursula, and Cruella de Vil, are then reformed by Mr. Gold with plans to rewrite the Once Upon a Time book with the help of the Author, resulting in the creation of an alternate reality known as Heroes & Villains. Henry and Emma race to restore reality and the truth before the twisted inversion becomes permanent, but as they succeed in doing so, the Darkness is unleashed which leads to Emma making a sacrifice to secure Regina's happiness.

Cast and characters

Regular

 Ginnifer Goodwin as Snow White / Mary Margaret Blanchard
 Jennifer Morrison as Emma Swan
 Lana Parrilla as Evil Queen / Regina Mills 
 Josh Dallas as Prince Charming / David Nolan
 Emilie de Ravin as Belle French
 Colin O'Donoghue as Captain Hook / Killian Jones
 Jared S. Gilmore as Henry Mills
 Michael Socha as Will Scarlet / Knave of Hearts
 Robert Carlyle as Rumplestiltskin / Mr. Gold

Recurring

 Sean Maguire as Robin Hood
 Georgina Haig as Elsa
 Elizabeth Lail as Anna
 Elizabeth Mitchell as Ingrid / Snow Queen / Sarah Fisher
 Scott Michael Foster as Kristoff
 Kristin Bauer van Straten as Maleficent
 Timothy Webber as the Apprentice
 Victoria Smurfit as Cruella De Vil / Cruella Feinberg
 Merrin Dungey as Ursula
 Lee Arenberg as Dreamy / Grumpy / Leroy
 Beverley Elliott as Widow Lucas / Granny
 Patrick Fischler as Isaac Heller / Author
 Faustino Di Bauda as Sleepy / Walter
 Christie Laing as Maid Marian
 Rebecca Mader as Zelena / Wicked Witch of the West
 Raphael Alejandro as Roland
 Eion Bailey as Pinocchio / August Booth
 Michael Coleman as Happy

 Gabe Khouth as Sneezy / Tom Clark
 Abby Ross as Young Emma Swan
 Keegan Connor Tracy as Blue Fairy / Mother Superior
 John Rhys-Davies as Grand Pabbie
 Agnes Bruckner as Lilith "Lily" Page
 Jason Burkart as Little John
 David Paul Grove as Doc
 Jeffrey Kaiser as Dopey
 Mig Macario as Bashful
 Tony Amendola as Mister Geppetto / Marco
 Sarah Bolger as Aurora
 Jakob Davies as young Pinocchio
 Giancarlo Esposito as Magic Mirror / Sidney Glass
 JoAnna Garcia as Ariel
 Chris Gauthier as Mr. Smee
 Barbara Hershey as Cora Mills / Queen of Hearts
 Tony Perez as Prince Henry Mills
 Raphael Sbarge as Jiminy Cricket / Dr. Archie Hopper

Guest

 Pascale Hutton as Gerda, Queen of Arendelle
 Tyler Jacob Moore as Hans
 Nils Hognestad as Franz
 Marcus Rosner as Jurgen
 Sally Pressman as Helga
 Nicole Muñoz as Young Lily
 Charles Mesure as Blackbeard
 Wil Traval as Sheriff of Nottingham / Keith
 Oliver Rice as King of Arendelle
 Robin Weigert as Bo Peep
 Gabrielle Rose as Ruth
 Brad Dourif as Zoso
 Eric Keenleyside as Maurice / Moe French

 Frances O'Connor as Colette
 Jessy Schram as Cinderella / Ashley Boyd
 Darcey Johnson as Oaken
 Brighton Sharbino as Young Ingrid
 Ava Marie Telek as Young Gerda
 Bailey Herbert as Young Helga
 Jonathan Runyon as a younger Duke of Weselton
 Rebecca Wisocky as Madam Faustina
 Sebastian Roché as King Stefan
 Ernie Hudson as Poseidon
 Tiffany Boone as Young Ursula
 Jonathan Adams voices The Sorcerer / Merlin

Episodes

Production

Development
The fourth season of Once Upon a Time was ordered on May 8, 2014, this announcement was followed by the announcement that the first half of the season will air during the autumn of 2014, while the second half will air during the spring of 2015. In August 2014, Maleficent was reported to be the main villain for the second half of the season. Prior to the season premiere, a special aired recapping the previous three seasons, and finished up with the introduction of the Frozen storyline. The theme for the season is "Never give up on the people you love".

Adam Horowitz initially announced that the 2-part episode, "Smash the Mirror", would air at the earlier time of 7/6c and will be two hours long, however this was later contradicted by the official Prime Time schedule which stated that it would premiere in its usual spot of 8/7c, the official ABC press release for the episode and the Futon Critic also supported this start time. Horowitz later clarified via Twitter that the extra hour was in addition to the already announced 22 episodes. He also confirmed that the winter finale would air on December 14, 2014, and later confirmed that the show will return from winter hiatus on March 1, 2015. On March 15, 2015, Horowitz confirmed that the last 2 episodes of the season will form a 2-hour episode.

It has been confirmed that, unlike the Frozen arc, the villains of the second half of season 4 will come from "[Once Upon a Time] mythology" instead of from their respective movies, so their origins will not be how people remember them, in particular, creator Adam Horowitz stated that "[Once] Cruella may have a different backstory than the one that people may remember from the movie" and explained that Maleficent has already been slotted into the mythology in previous seasons.

Another special, similar to the special that aired between the season 3 mid-season finale and premiere, aired an hour before the mid-season premiere on March 1, 2015 and was titled "Secrets of Storybrooke" and narrated by starring cast member Jennifer Morrison. The special focused on the topic of what it takes to have familiar fairy-tale characters who have been flipped on their heads from their respective origins.

Casting
After Once Upon a Time in Wonderland was canceled, it was reported that Michael Socha, who portrayed Will Scarlet / the Knave of Hearts in the spin-off, was in talks to join the main cast of Once Upon a Time as a series regular should the series receive renewal for a fourth season,  this was later confirmed on April 20, 2014 and on May 8, 2014, Socha was hired following the renewal. Michael Raymond-James was confirmed to not be returning as a main cast member, since his character, Neal Cassidy, was killed off. During San Diego Comic-Con 2014, it was officially announced that Ginnifer Goodwin would be returning as Snow White / Mary Margaret Blanchard along with fellow cast members Jennifer Morrison as Emma Swan, Josh Dallas as Prince Charming / David Nolan, Colin O'Donoghue as Captain Killian "Hook" Jones and Jared S. Gilmore as Henry Mills, Lana Parrilla as the Evil Queen / Regina Mills and Emilie de Ravin as Belle. De Ravin also confirmed Robert Carlyle's return as Rumpelstiltskin / Mr. Gold, through a photo on her Instagram.

On July 1, 2014, it was announced that Scott Michael Foster and Elizabeth Lail had been cast as Frozen characters Kristoff and Anna, respectively. The following day, it was announced Georgina Haig had been cast as Elsa. On July 8, 2014, Elizabeth Mitchell was revealed to have been cast in an undisclosed role. It was later revealed that she would be playing an evil Snow Queen, much like the one from the original Hans Christian Andersen fairytale. The character would later be revealed to be Anna and Elsa's aunt Ingrid. A real reindeer was brought in to portray Sven. On July 28, 2014, Tyler Jacob Moore and John Rhys-Davies were both announced to be playing Prince Hans and Grand Pabbie, respectively. The third episode, "Rocky Road", revealed that the roles of two of Hans' brothers, Franz and Jurgen, had been given to Nils Hognestad and Marcus Rosner respectively.

Returning recurring cast members include Sean Maguire as Robin Hood, Christie Laing as Maid Marian, Giancarlo Esposito as the Magic Mirror / Sidney Glass, Beverley Elliott as Granny, Lee Arenberg as Dreamy / Grumpy / Leroy, Raphael Sbarge as Jiminy Cricket / Dr. Archie Hopper and Keegan Connor Tracy as the Blue Fairy / Mother Superior. Faustino Di Bauda also returned as Sleepy / Walter, as did Kristin Bauer van Straten as Maleficent.

On September 4, it was revealed that Frances O’Connor was cast as Belle's mother, Colette for the sixth episode, although appearances later on in the season were also hinted. A new character, Lily, has been cast to Nicole Muñoz, while Sally Pressman was given the role of Helga. It was announced on November 5, 2014 that Victoria Smurfit would be portraying Cruella de Vil in a recurring capacity later on in the season and that hints will be placed in the next few episodes. Another Disney villain was also cast in the form of Ursula from The Little Mermaid who was portrayed by Merrin Dungey, the character portrayed is named after the original sea-goddess who was portrayed by Yvette Nicole Brown in the season 3 episode, "Ariel". Straten, Smurfit, and Dungey all first appeared in the winter finale, "Heroes and Villains", and are collectively called the "Queens of Darkness".

On October 17, 2014, Rebecca Wisocky was revealed to have been cast as the con-artist Madam Faustina for the tenth episode, "Shattered Sight", while a few days later on October 22, David Paul Grove, Gabe Khouth, Michael Coleman, Mig Macario and Jeffrey Kaiser were confirmed to be returning as the remaining seven dwarves. On October 25, 2014, Ginnifer Goodwin revealed that Mary Margaret's and David's son, Neal Nolan, is portrayed by eight different babies, adding: "I used to be like, 'babies look like babies.' And now that I have a baby, I'm like, how does the audience not notice that in every shot, this is a different kid?"

The season's first episode, "A Tale of Two Sisters" saw the return of Jason Burkart as Little John, who reprised his role in the sixth episode, and Raphael Alejandro as Roland who reprised the role in the third and sixth episodes, and introduced Pascale Hutton as the Queen of Arendelle, Anna and Elsa's mother, who reappeared in the seventh episode while the second episode, "White Out", introduced Robin Weigert as Bo Peep, and saw the return of Gabrielle Rose as Ruth, Prince Charming's mother. The fourth episode, "The Apprentice", introduced Timothy Webber as the Apprentice who reprised his role in the two-hour episode "Smash the Mirror", and the sixteenth episode, "Best Laid Plans". The fourth episode also saw the return of Brad Dourif as the previous Dark One, Zoso. The fifth episode, "Breaking Glass", saw the return of Abby Ross as a teenage Emma, who later also appeared in "Shattered Sight", "Best Laid Plans" and "Lily".

The sixth episode, "Family Business" saw the return of Eric Keenleyside as Maurice, Belle's father, and introduced Darcey Johnson as Oaken. The following episode, "The Snow Queen", saw the return of Jessy Schram as Ashley / Cinderella and Sarah Bolger as Aurora, and it also introduced Brighton Sharbino as a younger version of Elizabeth Mitchell's character, Ingrid, Ava Marie Telek as a younger version of Gerda, the Queen of Arendelle, Sally Pressman as Helga, Bailey Herbert as a young Helga, and Jonathan Runyon as a younger Duke of Weselton. The ninth episode, "Fall", saw the return of Charles Mesure as Black Beard. Patrick Fischler was cast in the recurring role of a Peddler initially named Gorin, who first appeared in "Best Laid Plans" where he was revealed to also be the Author.

During a second Q&A on December 15, 2014, Horowitz confirmed the return of Joanna Garcia Swisher as Ariel. On December 18, Eion Bailey was confirmed to be returning as August Booth / Pinocchio for "multiple Season 4 episodes", starting with the fourteenth episode, "Enter the Dragon". It was also revealed that Ernie Hudson had been cast as Poseidon, who is also Ursula's father, and Sebastian Roche as King Stefan. In February 2015, Rebecca Mader was confirmed to be returning as Wicked Witch of the West / Zelena  and Wil Traval was revealed to be returning as the Sheriff of Nottingham / Keith.

Agnes Bruckner was confirmed to appear in a three-episode arc in the role of an adult Lily, a friend of Emma from her childhood who was portrayed by Nicole Muñoz in the fifth episode, "Breaking Glass". On February 28, Horowitz confirmed the return of Barbara Hershey as Cora later in the season. The thirteenth episode, "Unforgiven", which aired on March 8, 2015, saw the return of Tony Amendola as Geppetto / Marco and Jakob Davies as young Pinocchio, his older counterpart Booth, portrayed by Bailey, was reintroduced in the following episode. The episode that aired on March 22, 2015, "Poor Unfortunate Soul", saw the return of Christopher Gauthier as William Smee and introduced Tiffany Boone as a younger version of Ursula. The following episode, "Best Laid Plans", saw the return of Barclay Hope as Lily's adoptive father.

Promotion 
A screening event for the season premiere, "A Tale of Two Sisters", was held on September 21, 2014, at the El Capitan Theatre.

The first half of the season used the tag-line "#OnceIsFrozen" for most of its run, and "#ShatteredSight" for the episodes "Fall" and "Shattered Sight". The second half of the season used the tag-line "#QueensOfDarkness" for most of its run, "#Cruella" for the episode "Sympathy for the De Vil", and "#HeroesAndVillains" for the season finale.

Broadcast
The season aired simultaneously on CTV in Canada, and on TVNZ in New Zealand.

Reception

Critical response
The review aggregator website Rotten Tomatoes reported a 58% approval rating with an average rating of 7.5/10 based on 11 reviews among critics and a score of 85% from 315 audience scores with an average rating of 4.2/5. The website's consensus reads, "The addition of a Frozen subplot feels like a marketing angle, but Once Upon a Time's season four shines, adding more layers to an already complex story."

Ratings

The premiere episode of the season, "A Tale of Two Sisters", achieved a weekly viewership ranking of #21.

References

External links
 

2014 American television seasons
2015 American television seasons
Season 4